Herkko Pöllänen (born 21 July 1994) is a Finnish tennis player.

Pöllänen has a career high ATP singles ranking of 711 achieved on 13 January 2014. He also has a career high ATP doubles ranking of 531 achieved on 6 February 2017.

Pöllänen represents Finland at the Davis Cup where he has a W/L record of 1–3. His first Davis Cup win came against Latvian tennis player Mārtiņš Podžus.

External links
 
 
 

1994 births
Living people
Finnish male tennis players
Sportspeople from Helsinki
Ohio State Buckeyes men's tennis players